The Yenangyaung University is a university, located in Yenangyaung, Magway Region, Myanmar.

History

The Regional College of Yenangyaung was founded on 23 May 1977. It was promoted to the Yenangyaung College in 1980,  to Yenangyaung Degree College on 26 June 2002 and to Yenangyaung University on 31, August, 2020.

Departments

Department of Myanmar
Department of English
Department of History
Department of Philosophy
Department of Geography
Department of Oriental Studies
Department of Mathematics 
Department of Chemistry 
Department of Physics 
Department of Zoology
Department of Botany 
Department of Geology

Sport Section

Sports facilities are:
Open shed
sport ground 
Indoor Stadium and
Recreation centre

International Partners

Peoples' Democratic Republic of Laos
Cambodia
People's Republic of China
Thailand
Vietnam

References 

Arts and Science universities in Myanmar
Universities and colleges in Magway Region
Universities and colleges in Myanmar